Let Me Fall is a 2018 Icelandic drama film directed by Baldvin Zophoníasson. It was screened in the Contemporary World Cinema section at the 2018 Toronto International Film Festival.

Plot
Stella and Magnea, two teenage girls meet at a party. They begin spending time together, experimenting with tobacco, alcohol, and drugs. Magnea eventually drops out of school and distances herself from her former friends. The story follows the two girls as they grow up, experience addiction, drug trafficking, prostitution, and stints in prison.

Cast
 Elín Sif Halldórsdóttir as Magnea
 Eyrún Björk Jakobsdóttir as young Stella
 Lára Jóhanna Jónsdóttir as older Stella
 Þorsteinn Bachmann as Hannes
 Atli Oskar Fjalarsson as Atli rauði
 Sveinn Ólafur Gunnarsson as Erlingur Hafsteinn
 Haraldur Stefansson as Gylfi

Reception
Let Me Fall was received positively by most critics, with The Hollywood Reporters Stephen Dalton saying that "framing the plot in female-driven coming-of-age terms, with a tortured same-sex romance at its heart... gives this story a fresher angle than most drug movies." Andrew Parker of The Gate said the film "eschews cheap clichés surrounding drug dependency in favour of a more delicately crafted, time shifting character study."

For The Canadian Press, David Friend said the film "doesn't blink in showing how drugs can destroy lives, and its heartbreaking moments come when it shows how powerless the people around an addict can feel."

References

External links
 Let Me Fall at the Icelandic Film Centre
 

2018 films
2018 drama films
Icelandic drama films
2010s Icelandic-language films
Films about drugs